Shawn Lewfatt (born 11 March 1977) is a former Australian rules footballer who played for Essendon in the Australian Football League (AFL).

He was drafted by the Essendon Football Club in the 1994 National draft at pick 28. He played three games with Essendon during the 1995 season.

External links

Shawn Lewfatt's profile on the Official AFL Website of the Essendon Football Club

Essendon Football Club players
Indigenous Australian players of Australian rules football
1977 births
Living people
Australian rules footballers from the Northern Territory
Western Jets players